Håkon Kindervåg (27 September 1922 – 11 March 1990) was a Norwegian footballer. He played in one match for the Norway national football team in 1954.

References

External links
 

1922 births
1990 deaths
Norwegian footballers
Norway international footballers
Place of birth missing
Association footballers not categorized by position